Ngoussoua is the name of several towns and villages in the Central African Republic:

Ngoussoua, Bamingui
Ngoussoua, Ndele